Ferry Beach State Park is a public recreation area occupying  on Saco Bay north of the mouth of the Saco River in Saco, Maine. The state park encompasses a sandy Atlantic Ocean beach, inland hiking trails, and nature center. The inland portion of the park is noted for its pocket swamp and tupelo trees found at the northern limit of the species's range. The park is managed by the Maine Department of Agriculture, Conservation and Forestry.

References

External links
Ferry Beach State Park Department of Agriculture, Conservation and Forestry

State parks of Maine
Protected areas of York County, Maine
Beaches of Maine
Saco, Maine
Landforms of York County, Maine
Nature centers in Maine